Chauncey Parker is an executive assistant district attorney in the office of Manhattan DA Cyrus Vance, Jr. He was formerly the Director of Criminal Justice Services in New York.  He was appointed to the position in 2002 by Gov. George Pataki and served until the end of the Pataki Administration in 2007.  He was a potential candidate for New York State Attorney General in 2006 as a Republican.

A graduate of Rollins College and Duke University School of Law, Director Parker is a lifelong New York resident.  He spent six years as an Assistant District Attorney in Manhattan and then 10 years as an Assistant United States Attorney in Manhattan.  During his career as a prosecutor, Parker worked on gang and narcotics crimes.

As Director of Criminal Justice Services, he was Pataki's chief criminal justice advisor and oversees the state's criminal justice agencies.

Parker was reported to be Pataki's choice to run for state attorney general in 2006.  He spoke at Republican candidates' forums and has granted press interviews about a potential race.  He did not run for attorney general as the Republican nomination went to former Westchester District Attorney Jeanine Pirro.

Parker serves as a member of the Board of Directors of the Police Athletic League of New York City, a nonprofit youth development agency that serves inner-city children and teenagers.

Parker was appointed Deputy Commissioner for Community Partnerships of the NYPD on 10 December 2019.

References

State cabinet secretaries of New York (state)
American prosecutors
Duke University School of Law alumni
New York (state) Republicans
Year of birth missing (living people)
Living people
Rollins College alumni